Tips may refer to:
 Tips Industries, an Indian film production company
 Tips (Windows), a component of Microsoft Windows
 Ernest Oscar Tips, a Belgian aviation designer and entrepreneur

TIPS as an acronym may refer to:
 Operation TIPS, Terrorism Information and Prevention System
 Tether Physics and Survivability Experiment, a satellite to experiment with space tether 
 Theory of Inventive Problem Solving, see TRIZ
 Thermally Induced Phase Separation, a common method used in scaffold design for tissue engineering
 Treatment Improvement Protocols (TIPs), a series of best-practice manuals for the treatment of substance use and other related disorders published by the US government
 Transjugular intrahepatic portosystemic shunt, an artificial channel within the liver
 Treasury Inflation-Protected Securities, a set of Bonds issued by the U.S. Treasury
 Trends in Pharmacological Sciences, a journal in the Trends series 
 Trends in Plant Science, a journal in the Trends series
 Triisopropylsilyl, a type of silyl ether
 Triisopropylsilane, a hydrosilane
 Turkish Institute for Police Studies, University of North Texas

See also
 Tip (disambiguation)